The 2014–15 Army Black Knights men's basketball team represented the United States Military Academy during the 2014–15 NCAA Division I men's basketball season. The Black Knights, led by sixth year head coach Zach Spiker, played their home games at Christl Arena and were members of the Patriot League. They finished the season 15–15, 6–12 in Patriot League play to finish in last place. They lost in the first round of the Patriot League tournament to Navy.

Roster

Schedule

|-
!colspan=9 style="background:#000000; color:#D6C499;"| Non-conference regular season

|-
!colspan=9 style="background:#000000; color:#D6C499;"| Conference regular season

|-
!colspan=9 style="background:#000000; color:#D6C499;"| Patriot League tournament

References

Army Black Knights men's basketball seasons
Army
Army Black Knights men's basketball
Army Black Knights men's basketball